The Sanjâbi or Senjâwi, is one of the biggest Kurdish tribes in Kermanshah Province of Iran and is also found in Sulaymaniyah in Kurdistan Region. The Sanjabi dialect is a branch of southern Kurdish language family. They are notable for having played a leading role in the intertribal history of western Iran, protecting its borders against neighbouring powers—the Russian, British, and especially the Ottoman Empire.

See also
 Karim Sanjabi - chief of Sanjabi tribe in the last decades of 20th century and was a liberal political leader in Iran

References

Sources 
 
 Karim Sanjabi, Hopes and Despairs: The Political Memoirs, London, 1989 
 علی اکبر خان، سردار مقتدر سنجابی. ایل سنجابی و مجاهدت‌های ملی ایران. تحریر و تحشیه دکتر کریم سنجابی. تهران: نشر شیرازه، 1380 

Kurdish tribes